Shuidiao Getou is the name of a traditional Chinese melody to which a poem in the cí style can be sung. Different poets have written different lyrics to the melody which are usually prefixed by this melody's title, the Song dynasty poet Su Shi's work "Shuǐdiào Gētóu –  Míngyuè Jǐshíyǒu  " being one of the most famous.

Cí is one of the literary genres that are unique to the Song dynasty, and can be sung to melody.  Many ancient melodies are lost to history, but modern composers often compose new melodies for cí.

Text of Su's poem

Notes on the poem

In popular culture 
In 1983, Liang Hong Zhi set Su's poem to new music as the song "Danyuan ren changjiu" (translated "Wishing We Last Forever" or "Always Faithful"). This new setting was recorded by Teresa Teng in her album dandan youqing, which also contained songs based on other poems from the Tang and Song dynasties. Later artists such as Faye Wong, Jacky Cheung and China Flowers covered this song in albums and concerts.

Other uses 

In June 1956, Mao Zedong wrote the poem "Shuǐdiào Gētóu – Swimming" which is also rhymed to the tune of Shuǐdiào Gētóu.

References

External links 
 Original Chinese poem at Project Gutenberg
 English translation by Qiu Xiaolong
 
 

Chinese poems
Su Shi